Planet Cosmo is a British-Irish children’s animated television series about space. The series mainly airs on RTEjr and will be on CITV.

Premise 
Cosmo and her family live on the moon and explore space together. Through fun, songs and adventure,  children learn about all planets of the Solar System.

Characters 
Cosmo (voiced by Ali Lyons) The main character of the series. She is a young astronaut who loves to go explore the planets with Dad.

Sol (voiced by Elijah O'Sullivan) A younger astronaut who is Cosmo's little brother. He speaks in a lisp.

Jupiter (voiced by Jason Tammemägi) Cosmo's dad; he is very silly and sometimes clumsy.

Venus (voiced by Doireann Ní Chorragáin) Cosmo's mum; she is very sensitive and a professional and sometimes stubborn.

GIL (voiced by Paul Tylak) A supercomputer who sometimes crashes.

Lifter (voiced by Paul Tylak) A rover who's strong and sometimes clumsy.

Cian (voiced by Cian Vaughan (voiced by himself)) is the astronomer to teach the kids about the planets. He is both animated and in live-action in two different versions.

Release 
A double DVD was released with 15 episodes that ran for 195 minutes/3 hours.

References 

British children's animated space adventure television series
Irish children's animated space adventure television series
ITV children's television shows